On the Waters is the second album by Bread, released in July 1970. After the commercial failure of their first album, Gates, Griffin and Royer, along with studio drummer Mike Botts, returned to the studio in a second attempt to make a hit record. Thanks largely to the success of the coinciding single Make It With You / Why Do You Keep Me Waiting, the album was a success, peaking at 12 on Billboard 200.

Track listing

Side One
"Why Do You Keep Me Waiting" – 2:32 (Griffin, Royer)
"Make It with You" – 3:18 (Gates)
"Blue Satin Pillow" – 2:29 (Gates)
"Look What You've Done" – 3:14 (Griffin, Royer)
"I Am That I Am" – 3:20 (Griffin, Royer)
"Been Too Long on the Road" – 4:53 (Gates)

Side Two
"I Want You with Me" – 2:52 (Gates, Griffin)
"Coming Apart" – 3:30 (Griffin, Royer)
"Easy Love" – 2:28 (Griffin, Royer)
"In the Afterglow" – 2:38 (Gates)
"Call on Me" – 4:03 (Griffin, Royer)
"The Other Side of Life" – 2:02 (Gates)

Personnel
David Gates - vocals, guitar, bass, keyboards
James Griffin - vocals, guitar, keyboards, bass
Robb Royer - guitar, bass, keyboards, flute
Mike Botts - drums, percussion

References

Bread (band) albums
1970 albums
Elektra Records albums
Rhino Entertainment albums
Albums produced by David Gates
Albums produced by Jimmy Griffin
Albums produced by Robb Royer